The spinning frame is an Industrial Revolution invention for spinning thread or yarn from fibres such as wool or cotton in a mechanized way.  It was developed in 18th-century Britain by Richard Arkwright and John Kay.

Historical context

In 1760 England, yarn production from wool, flax and cotton was still a cottage industry in which fibres were carded and spun by hand using a spinning wheel.  As the textile industry expanded its markets and adopted faster machines, yarn supplies became scarce especially due to innovations such as the doubling of the loom speed after the invention of the flying shuttle.  High demand for yarn spurred invention of the spinning jenny in 1764, followed closely by the invention of the spinning frame, later developed into the water frame (patented in 1769).  Mechanisms had increased production of yarn so dramatically that by 1830 the yarn cottage industry in England could no longer compete and all spinning was carried out in factories.

Development
Richard Arkwright employed John Kay to produce a new spinning machine that Kay had worked on with (or possibly stolen from) another inventor called Thomas Highs.  With the help of other local craftsmen the team produced the spinning frame, which produced a stronger thread than the spinning jenny produced by James Hargreaves.  The frame employed the draw rollers invented by Lewis Paul to stretch, or attenuate, the yarn.

The roller spinning process starts with a thick 'string' of loose fibres called a roving, which is passed between three pairs of rollers, each pair rotating slightly faster than the previous one. In this way it is reduced in thickness and increased in length before a strengthening twist is added by a bobbin-and-flyer mechanism.  The spacing of the rollers has to be slightly greater than the fiber length to prevent breakage. The nip of the roller pairs prevents the twist from backing up to the roving.

Too large to be operated by hand, the spinning frame needed a new source of power.  Arkwright experimented with horses, but decided to employ the power of the water wheel, which gave the invention the name 'water frame'.

For some time, the stronger yarn produced by the spinning frame was used in looms for the lengthwise warp threads that bound cloth together, while hand powered jennies provided the weaker yarn used for the horizontal filler (weft) threads.  The jennies required skill but were inexpensive and could be used in a home.  The spinning frames required capital but little skill.

Notes

Bibliography

External links

Essay on Arkwright, showing his links with Kay and Highs.

Textile machinery
Spinning
English inventions
History of the textile industry
Industrial Revolution in England